The Industrial and Commercial Bank of China (Asia), or more commonly known as ICBC (Asia) (Traditional Chinese: 中國工商銀行(亞洲), 工銀亞洲) is a licensed bank incorporated in Hong Kong. It is a subsidiary of the Industrial and Commercial Bank of China.

History
ICBC acquired Union Bank of Hong Kong (友聯銀行), founded in Hong Kong in 1964, and traded on the Hong Kong Stock Exchange since 1973, on August 21, 2000; ICBC then renamed its acquisition ICBC (Asia) in July 2001.

On April 30, 2004, ICBC (Asia) acquired the retail banking business (but not the wholesale banking business) of Fortis Bank Asia HK from Fortis. Fortis Bank Asia became a wholly owned subsidiary of ICBC (Asia) and reverted to its earlier name, Belgian Bank. On October 10, 2005, all Belgian Bank's branches were rebranded as ICBC (Asia). This merger has resulted in ICBC (Asia) rising to the position of being the sixth largest bank on the Hong Kong Stock Exchange, from its former position of tenth.

In November 2010, the company said it had obtained shareholder approval to take the Hong Kong unit private. It is delisted from the Hong Kong Stock Exchange in December 2010.

See also
List of banks in Hong Kong
Union Bank of Hong Kong

References

External links

 Company website
 Company website

Banks of Hong Kong
Banks established in 2001
Companies formerly listed on the Hong Kong Stock Exchange
Industrial and Commercial Bank of China